The 2000 AFC Asian Cup Final was a football match which determined the winner of the 2000 AFC Asian Cup, the 12th edition of the AFC Asian Cup, a quadrennial tournament contested by the men's national teams of the member associations of the Asian Football Confederation. The match was held at the Camille Chamoun Sports City Stadium in Beirut, Lebanon, on 20 October 2000 and was contested by Japan and Saudi Arabia.

Japan had won its only previous appearance in an AFC Asian Cup final, when they hosted the 1992 tournament, while Saudi Arabia were playing their fifth consecutive, and in total. The 2000 final was set up to be a repeat of the 1992 final, in which Japan beat Saudi Arabia 1–0. Indeed, 1–0 would also be the scoreline of the 2000 final: after Saudi Arabia's Hamzah Falatah missed a penalty, Japan scored in the first half thanks to a Shigeyoshi Mochizuki goal in the first half. Yoshikatsu Kawaguchi's numerous saves, which denied Saudi Arabia from scoring, earned him the Man of the Match award.

Venue 
The Camille Chamoun Sports City Stadium, located in Beirut, Lebanon, hosted the 2000 AFC Asian Cup Final. The 49,500-seat stadium was built in 1957, and is primarily used by the Lebanon national football team. It was the main stadium used to host the 2000 Asian Cup; six matches were played in the stadium including the opening match and the final.

Route to the final

Match

Summary 
The match kicked off at 16:00 local time in Beirut at the Camille Chamoun Sports City Stadium, in front of an announced attendance of 49,500 spectators. In the 10th minute of play, Japanese midfielder Shigeyoshi Mochizuki fouled opposing midfielder Talal Al-Meshal in the box; however, Saudi Arabian striker Hamzah Idris missed the subsequent penalty. The Japanese side came close to scoring twice, with two attacking opportunities by striker Naohiro Takahara, before Mochizuki scored from close range after a free kick by Shunsuke Nakamura from the left. In the 42nd minute Japan had an opportunity to double the lead after Nakamura hit the crossbar.

In the second half of the game, Saudi Arabia responded with their own attacking play, moving the momentum in their favour. Substitute Mohammad Al-Shalhoub and midfielder Nawaf Al-Temyat both missed from long range, before Al-Shalhoub forced Japanese goalkeeper Yoshikatsu Kawaguchi to produce a "spectacular" save in the 59th minute. Five minutes later, Kawaguchi saved a header from Al-Meshal. Japan's attacking occasions in the second half came from counterattacks.

Japanese striker Atsushi Yanagisawa was subbed on in the 80th minute, before being subbed off only seven minutes later; Philippe Troussier, Japan's manager, stated: "[Yanagisawa] didn't do what I asked him to". Noted as the "best save of the match", in the 87th minute Kawaguchi dove to his right to save a 25-meter shot by Nawaf Al-Temyat. The match ended 1–0 to Japan and Kawaguchi was awarded the Man of the Match award.

Details

References

External links 
 

Final
2000s in Beirut
2000
October 2000 sports events in Asia
Japan national football team matches
Saudi Arabia national football team matches
Sports competitions in Beirut
2000 in Japanese football
2000–01 in Saudi Arabian football
Japan–Saudi Arabia relations
Association football matches in Lebanon
Events at Camille Chamoun Sports City Stadium